Manoj Pahwa (born 8 December 1963), is an Indian film and television actor who is noted for his role as Bhatia in the comedy series Office Office (2001). He has acted in over 70 films as a character actor, including 7½ Phere (2005), Being Cyrus (2005), Singh Is Kinng (2008), Dabangg 2 (2012), Jolly LLB (2013), Dil Dhadakne Do (2015), Mulk (2018) and Article 15 (2019).

Early life and education
Pahwa was raised in a Punjabi family in  Delhi. His father migrated from Punjab,Pakistan, after Partition. He was educated at the National Public School in Daryaganj, New Delhi.
In an interview,Pahwa stated that he lived in East Delhi Lakshmi Nagar after his father built house for them. His father had automobile batteries business and his father wanted him to join family business. Pahwa shifted to Mumbai in his late twenties.

Personal life
He is married to actress Seema Bhargava, his co-actor in TV series Hum Log,  and lives in Versova, Mumbai, along with his daughter Manukriti Pahwa and son Mayank.

Career
Pahwa started his career with television, acting in comedy series Just Mohabbat (1996-2000) and Office Office (2001). He debuted in the movie Tere Mere Sapne (1996) and has acted in 50+ films and TV series as a character actor.

He played the lead the opening segment of anthology horror film Darna Zaroori Hai (2006) directed by Sajid Khan.

During the shoot for Mausam (2011) directed by Pankaj Kapoor, in Chandigarh, he met the local producers, which led to his Punjabi film debut, Heer & Hero.

Filmography

Films

Television

Web series

Nominations

References

External links

 
 

1963 births
Living people
Indian male film actors
Male actors in Hindi cinema
Indian male television actors
Punjabi people
Male actors from Delhi
Indian male comedians
Male actors in Hindi television